Horamella is a genus of moths in the subfamily Arctiinae. It contains the single species Horamella fassli, which is found in Colombia.

References

Natural History Museum Lepidoptera generic names catalog

Arctiinae
Monotypic moth genera